The Good Neighbour is a 2011 German film directed by Stephan Rick. It premiered in competition at the 2011 Shanghai International Film Festival and was screened at the 2011 Montreal World Film Festival and the Hof International Film Festival. In 2022, Rick directed an English-language remake of his own film (under the same title), starring Jonathan Rhys Meyers as Robert Graetz, Luke Kleintank as David Ahrens, Eloise Smyth as Vanessa Rafael, Bruce Davison as Grant and Ieva Florence as Janine Rafael.

The Good Neighbour was shot on location in Karlsruhe, Baden-Baden (including the Waldenecksee) and Mannheim, Germany. The thriller, about a new friendship between two men that takes a dark turn is Rick's debut feature film. His previous work, the children's TV series Allein gegen die Zeit, had been nominated for the German Television Award and the International Emmy Award. The film got half its funding coming from German broadcaster ARD’s SWR unit and from the film fund of Baden-Wuerttemberg.

Charly Hübner was awarded "Best German actor" of 2013, a Golden Camera Award.

Cast
 Maxim Mehmet as David Ahrens
 Charly Hübner as Robert Graetz
 Petra Schmidt-Schaller as Vanessa Rafael
 Helmut Rühl as Inspector Wagner
 Rainer Sellien as Hannes Fieser
 Katharina Heyer as Janine Rafael

References

External links
 Official website

2011 films
2010s German-language films
German thriller films
Films shot in Germany
2011 thriller films
2010s German films